Ugochukwu Amadi (born May 16, 1997) is an American football free safety for the New Orleans Saints of the National Football League (NFL). He played college football at Oregon and was drafted by the Seattle Seahawks in the fourth round of the 2019 NFL Draft. As a senior in 2018, he won the Lombardi Award.

College career
Amadi signed with Oregon out of John Overton High School in Nashville, Tennessee as a consensus four-star cornerback over numerous Power 5 offers. Amadi played in all 51 games and had 34 starts for the Ducks from 2015-2018 and finished with 165 total tackles, 9.5 tackles for a loss for 54 yards, three sacks for 16 yards, eight interceptions for 122 yards and two touchdowns, 33 passes defended, four forced fumbles, and two fumble recoveries on defense.

Professional career

Seattle Seahawks
Amadi was drafted by the Seattle Seahawks in the fourth round (132nd overall) of the 2019 NFL Draft.

Philadelphia Eagles
On August 15, 2022, Amadi was traded to the Philadelphia Eagles for tight end J. J. Arcega-Whiteside.

Tennessee Titans
On August 24, 2022, less than 10 days after being traded to Philadelphia, Amadi was traded to the Tennessee Titans paired with Philadelphia's 2024 seventh round pick in exchange for Tennessee's 2024 sixth round pick.  He was waived on October 31.

Kansas City Chiefs
On November 3, 2022, Amadi was signed to the Kansas City Chiefs practice squad. Amadi became a Super Bowl champion when the Chiefs defeated the Philadelphia Eagles in Super Bowl LVII.

New Orleans Saints
On March 7, 2023, Amadi signed with the New Orleans Saints.

References

External links

Oregon Ducks bio

1997 births
Living people
Players of American football from Nashville, Tennessee
American football safeties
Oregon Ducks football players
Seattle Seahawks players
Philadelphia Eagles players
Tennessee Titans players
Kansas City Chiefs players
New Orleans Saints players